Vougy may refer to the following places in France:

 Vougy, Loire, a commune in the Loire department
 Vougy, Haute-Savoie, a commune in the Haute-Savoie department